Kırıkkale is the capital of the Kırıkkale Province in the Central Anatolia region of Turkey. It is located 80 km east of Ankara which is the capital city of Turkey. According to the 2000 census, the population of the province is 280,834, of which 192,705 live in the city of Kırıkkale. The name of the city means broken castle.

The town of Kırıkkale is located on the Ankara-Kayseri railway near the Kızılırmak River in central Turkey. Formerly a village, it owes its rapid rise in population mainly to the establishment of steel mills in the 1950s. These works, among the largest in the country, specialize in high-quality alloy steel and machinery. In the 1960s, chemical plants were added and in 1986, the Tüpraş Kırıkkale Oil Refinery was established.

Kırıkkale University is located in the city.

History
The name of the city supposedly comes from the name "Kırık" a village 3 km north of the city combined with another name called "Kale", meaning castle, in the centre of the city, the two were put together to make 'Kırıkkale'. Kırıkkale in Turkish means "broken castle". Inhabitation began in the 16th century when Turkish tribes came from the east and settled in Central Anatolia.

Geography
Kırıkkale was recently declared a state in the Central Anatolia region of Turkey which is near Kızılırmak River translating to Red River. The river is used to produce rice for the Turkish economy. The natural vegetation is steppe type, and vineyards are found in abundance.

Economy

Climate
Kırıkkale has a cold semi-arid climate (Köppen: BSk) or a continental climate (Trewartha: Dc). Winters are cold and moderately snowy, whereas summers are hot and dry. Rainfall is most common during spring and autumn.

Notes

References

External links

 District governor's official website 
 District municipality's official website 
 Kirikkale University official website
 Kirikkale haberleri

 
Cities in Turkey
Districts of Kırıkkale Province